Marin Aničić (born 17 August 1989) is a Bosnian professional footballer who plays as a centre-back for Bosnian Premier League club Sarajevo.

Aničić started his professional career at Zrinjski Mostar, before joining Astana in 2014. Five years later, he moved to Konyaspor. In 2022, he signed with Sarajevo.

A former youth international for Bosnia and Herzegovina, Aničić made his senior international debut in 2016.

Club career

Early career
Aničić came through youth academy of his hometown club Zrinjski Mostar. He made his professional debut against Slavija on 28 November 2007 at the age of 18. On 2 April 2008, he scored his first professional goal in a triumph over Orašje.

Astana
In February 2014, Aničić was transferred to Kazakh side Astana for an undisclosed fee. On 15 March, he made his official debut for the team against Zhetysu. He won his first trophy with the club on 9 November, when they were crowned league champions for the first time in their history.

Aničić helped Astana make their first historical UEFA Champions League appearance in 2015–16 season. On 15 September 2015, he debuted in the competition away at Benfica. Two months later, he scored his first goal in the tournament against same opponent, which was his first goal for the team.

Aničić scored his first league goal in a defeat of Ordabasy on 20 March 2016. In August, he extended his contract until June 2019. On 2 October, he played his 100th game for the side.

He appeared in his 200th match for the club on 14 April 2019.

Konyaspor
In August, Aničić signed a two-year deal with Turkish outfit Konyaspor. He made his competitive debut for the club on 18 August against Ankaragücü. On 25 July 2020, he scored his first goal for Konyaspor against Alanyaspor.

In January 2021, he suffered a severe knee injury, which was diagnosed as anterior cruciate ligament tear and was ruled out for at least six months. He returned to the pitch on 28 November, over ten months after the injury.

Later stage of career
In June 2022, Aničić moved to Sarajevo.

International career
Aničić was a member of Bosnia and Herzegovina under-21 team for several years.

In August 2015, he received his first senior call-up, for UEFA Euro 2016 qualifiers against Belgium and Andorra, but had to wait until 25 March 2016 to make his debut in a friendly game against Luxembourg.

Career statistics

Club

International

Honours
Zrinjski Mostar
Bosnian Premier League: 2008–09
Bosnian Cup: 2007–08

Astana
Kazakhstan Premier League: 2014, 2015, 2016, 2017, 2018
Kazakhstan Cup: 2016
Kazakhstan Super Cup: 2015, 2018, 2019

References

External links

1989 births
Living people
Sportspeople from Mostar
Croats of Bosnia and Herzegovina
Bosnia and Herzegovina footballers
Bosnia and Herzegovina under-21 international footballers
Bosnia and Herzegovina international footballers
Bosnia and Herzegovina expatriate footballers
Association football central defenders
HŠK Zrinjski Mostar players
FC Astana players
FK Sarajevo players
Konyaspor footballers
Premier League of Bosnia and Herzegovina players
Kazakhstan Premier League players
Süper Lig players
Expatriate footballers in Kazakhstan
Expatriate footballers in Turkey
Bosnia and Herzegovina expatriate sportspeople in Kazakhstan
Bosnia and Herzegovina expatriate sportspeople in Turkey